Michael Bleekemolen (born 2 October 1949 in Amsterdam, the Netherlands) is a racing driver who currently competes in the NASCAR Whelen Euro Series, driving for the family-owned Team Bleekemolen in the No. 72 Ford Mustang in the EuroNASCAR 2 class. He previously raced for the RAM and ATS teams in Formula One.
 
He graduated from Formula Vee and tried his hand at Formula One in 1977, where he failed to qualify at his home Grand Prix. Nevertheless, he returned the following year with ATS for four races, but qualified only once, at Watkins Glen.

After Formula One, he returned to Formula 3 for another three years, winning two rounds of the European Championship and finishing second in the series to Alain Prost. From there he moved to one-make Renault racing, where he remains to this day. His sons Jeroen and Sebastiaan are also racers.

Racing record

Complete Formula One results
(key)

Complete European Formula Two Championship results
(key) (Races in bold indicate pole position; races in italics indicate fastest lap)

Complete Porsche Supercup results
(key) (Races in bold indicate pole position) (Races in italics indicate fastest lap)

‡ Not eligible for points

Complete NASCAR results

Whelen Euro Series – EuroNASCAR 2

References

Sources

Profile at www.grandprix.com

Career summary on Driver Database

1949 births
Living people
Dutch racing drivers
Dutch Formula One drivers
ATS Wheels Formula One drivers
Sportspeople from Amsterdam
Porsche Supercup drivers
RAM Racing Formula One drivers
ADAC GT Masters drivers
24 Hours of Spa drivers
Sports car racing team owners
NASCAR drivers
BMW M drivers
24H Series drivers
Porsche Carrera Cup Germany drivers